The 2018 Colorado Attorney General election took place on November 6, 2018, to elect the attorney general of Colorado.

Incumbent Republican Cynthia Coffman did not run for re-election, instead opting to run for Governor. The Democratic Party nominated Phil Weiser, who subsequently defeated Republican nominee George Brauchler in the general election.

Republican primary 
Arapahoe County District Attorney George Brauchler won the Republican nomination unopposed.

Democratic primary

Convention results 
Phil Weiser and Joe Salazar qualified for the Democratic primary ballot. Attorney Amy Padden did not qualify.

Primary results 
Former Dean of the University of Colorado Law School Phil Weiser defeated State Representative Joe Salazar.

Libertarian nomination 
Attorney William F. Robinson, III was the Libertarian nominee.

General election 

Weiser won the general election by a 6.5% margin of victory.

References 

Attorney General
Colorado
Colorado Attorney General elections